The Glass Cell is a 1978 West German crime film directed by Hans W. Geißendörfer and starring Brigitte Fossey, Helmut Griem and Dieter Laser. It is based on the 1964 novel of the same name by Patricia Highsmith. It was nominated for the Academy Award for Best Foreign Language Film at the 51st Academy Awards.

It was shot at the Bavaria Studios and on location around Munich and Frankfurt. The film's sets were designed by the art director Heidi Lüdi.

Cast
 Brigitte Fossey as Lisa Braun
 Helmut Griem as Phillip Braun
 Dieter Laser as David Reinelt
 Walter Kohut as Robert Lasky
 Claudius Kracht as Timmie Braun
 Günter Strack as Direktor Goller
 Hans-Günter Martens as Prosecutor
 Edith Volkmann as Nachbarin
 Bernhard Wicki as Kommissar Österreicher
 Martin Flörchinger

See also
 List of submissions to the 51st Academy Awards for Best Foreign Language Film
 List of German submissions for the Academy Award for Best Foreign Language Film

References

External links

1978 films
1970s psychological thriller films
German crime thriller films
West German films
1970s German-language films
Films based on American novels
Films based on works by Patricia Highsmith
Films directed by Hans W. Geißendörfer
Films shot at Bavaria Studios
1970s German films